Place Ambroise-Courtois is a square in the neighborhood of Monplaisir in the 8th arrondissement of Lyon. It was named after , a city councillor, on 30 October 1944, months after Courtois was assassinated by the Milice française. It had been previously named Place de Monplaisir.

Buildings and monuments 
 At the north end of the square is a monument to Auguste and Louis Lumière, who were the inventors of the cinematograph and lived in a villa adjacent to the square.
 The Institut Lumière, located at the west end of the square, is the former home of the Lumière brothers.
 There is a bust of Ambroise Courtois at the south end of the square.
 There is a bandstand in the middle of the square.

See also 
 List of streets and squares in Lyon

References

External links 

  

8th arrondissement of Lyon
Squares in Lyon